Eleven ships of the Royal Navy have borne the name HMS Hawk after the bird of prey, the hawk:

  was an 8-gun sloop that foundered in 1731.
  was a 10-gun sloop launched in 1741 and broken up in 1747.
  was a 10-gun sloop launched in 1756.  She was captured by the French in 1759, but was retaken in 1761.  She was then sold in 1781.
  is recorded as being a 10-gun sloop launched in 1761, though she may be the previous HMS Hawk after a rebuild.
  was a 6-gun schooner in service from 1775.  An American squadron captured her off Rhode Island on 4 April 1776.
  was a 16-gun sloop launched in 1793 and broken up in 1803.
  was a galley in service in 1795 and sold in 1796.
  was an 18-gun sloop, previously the French privateer Atalante.  captured her in 1803 and she foundered in 1804.
She was renamed HMS Buzzard in 1812 and was sold in 1814. 
  was a screw coastguard vessel launched in 1869. She was renamed HMS Amelia in 1888.
  was a coastguard vessel.  She had been launched in 1884 and had previously been in civilian service as Lady Aline.  She was purchased by the Navy in 1888 and briefly named HMS Oberon before being named HMS Hawk.  She was renamed HMS Undine in 1904 and was sold in 1906.

See also
 Royal Navy ships named 
 , two ships of the Royal Australian Navy
 , several ships of the U.S. Navy

Notes

References
 
 
 

Royal Navy ship names